= Book of Orders =

The Book of Orders, distributed to Justices of the Peace by King Charles I of England on 31 January 1631, having been drafted by the Lord Chief Justice at the time, has been regarded as the "centre-piece of Charles I's policies towards the mass of his subjects during his personal rule", which lasted from 1629 until 1640. As described in its introduction, the purpose of The Book was to ensure "better administration of justice ... relief of the poor and ... reformation of disorders", greatly increasing the control of Charles' government over what had until then been largely local affairs handled by the local gentry.

The Book of Orders, is said to have demanded more from the elite in society, and was one of the grievances which contributed to Personal Rule coming to an end.
